Baseball at the 1975 Pan American Games was contested between teams representing Canada, Colombia, Cuba, Dominican Republic, El Salvador, Mexico, Puerto Rico, United States, and Venezuela. The 1975 edition was the seventh Pan American Games, and was hosted by Mexico City.

Cuba entered the competition as the defending champions, having won the gold medal in 1971. They successfully defended their title, with the United States finishing second.

Medal summary

Medal table

Medalists

References

 

1975 Pan American Games
1975
Pan American Games
1975 Pan American Games